The Thomas Brothers T-2 was an American-built biplane which served with the Royal Navy.

Built by Thomas-Morse Aircraft in Bath, New York, in 1914, it was the creation of Benjamin D. Thomas (later the company's chief designer), based on his Curtiss JN-4 (which it resembles), and used the 90 hp (67 kW) Austro-Daimler.

Twenty-four aircraft, in two batches, were provided to the Royal Naval Air Service, the Austro-Daimler being replaced by a similar-horsepower Curtiss OX-5

An additional fifteen, differing in being fitted with floats in place of wheels, a  Thomas among other engines in place of the OX-5, and three-bay wings spanning 44 ft (13.41 m), were sold to the United States Navy as the SH-4. at US$7,575 each.

Operators

Royal Naval Air Service

Specifications (T-2)

See also

References
Notes

Bibliography
 Donald, David, ed. Encyclopedia of World Aircraft, p. 875, "Thomas Brothers and Thomas-Morse aircraft". Etobicoke, Ontario: Prospero Books, 1997.
 Wegg, John. General Dynamics Aircraft and their Predecessors. London:Putnam, 1990. .

External links
Aerofiles

1910s United States military utility aircraft
Thomas-Morse aircraft
Single-engined tractor aircraft
Aircraft first flown in 1914
Biplanes